E-55888 is a drug developed by Esteve, which acts as a potent and selective full agonist at the 5HT7 serotonin receptor, and is used for investigating the role of 5-HT7 receptors in the perception of pain. When administered by itself, E-55888 is anti-hyperalgesic but not analgesic, but when administered alongside morphine, E-55888 was found to significantly increase the analgesic effects.

See also
 AS-19
 LP-12
 LP-44
 LP-211

References

5-HT7 agonists
Pyrazoles
Phenethylamines